The Farnese Hours is an illuminated manuscript created by Giulio Clovio for Cardinal Alessandro Farnese in 1546. Considered the masterpiece of Clovio, this book of hours is now in the possession of the Morgan Library & Museum in New York City.

It contains religious stories (both Biblical and apocryphal), and illustrations with architectural borders and classical nudes.

Notes

Illuminated books of hours
1546 books
Collection of the Morgan Library & Museum
1546 in art